Eddie Edwards (born 3 July 1956) is a retired professional tour tennis player.

The right-handed Edwards was a tour regular from the mid-1970s to the end of 1987. He played in singles a total of 112 grand prix (including World Championship Tennis events) and 24 grand slam tournaments. His best results were on grass, reaching the fourth round of Wimbledon in 1986 and winning the Adelaide grand prix event in 1985. He reached his career-high singles ranking of world No. 42 in July 1986.

Tennis career
Edwards's career singles record for grand prix and grand slam events was 87 wins and 135 defeats.  He also won four doubles titles on tour - Bournemouth in 1980 partnering Craig Edwards of California, Melbourne in 1982 partnering Englishman Jonathan Smith, Lorraine Open 1984 and Bristol Open in 1985, partnering compatriot Danie Visser. Edwards also reached doubles finals in 1981 in Adelaide and at the Stuttgart Indoor with Craig Edwards as his partner, 1985 in Livingston with Visser, and 1986 in Chicago and Newport with Paraguayan Francisco González.  He reached a career high doubles ranking of World No. 40 in July 1988.  He also partnered American Andy Andrews and won numerous tour doubles titles.

Edwards played college tennis from 1978 through 1980 and earned All-American honors each year while attending Pepperdine University.  He had 62 career match wins and an .805 winning percentage (62-15) at Pepperdine.

Career finals

Singles: 1 (1 win)

Doubles (4 wins, 5 losses)

References

External links
 
 

1956 births
Living people
Tennis players from Johannesburg
Pepperdine Waves men's tennis players
South African expatriates in the United States
South African male tennis players
South African people of British descent
White South African people